Edmund Harvel was a 16th-century English diplomat.

Harvel was the English ambassador to Venice in the 1540s, during the reign of Henry VIII.

References

Year of birth unknown
Year of death unknown
Ambassadors of England to the Republic of Venice
16th-century English diplomats